Fade into Light is the twelfth studio album by Boz Scaggs, released in Japan in 1996 and the U.S. in 2005. The album was a mix of new original compositions and new recordings of Scaggs' classic hits.

1996 release track list

All songs are written by Boz Scaggs unless noted.

  "Lowdown" (Unplugged) (Boz Scaggs, David Paich)
  "Some Things Happen" (Boz Scaggs, Marcus Miller)
  "Just Go"
  "Fade Into Light"
  "Harbor Lights" (Unplugged)
  "Lost It" (Valley Version)
  "Time"
  "Sierra"
  "We're All Alone" (Unplugged)
  "Simone" (Boz Scaggs, David Foster)
  "I'll Be the One" (Remix)

2005 release track list 

  "Lowdown" (Unplugged)  (Boz Scaggs, David Paich)
  "Some Things Happen"  (Boz Scaggs, Marcus Miller)
  "Just Go"
  "Love T.K.O."  (Cecil Womack, Linda Womack, Gip Noble)
  "Fade Into Light"
  "Harbor Lights"
  "Lost It"
  "Time"
  "Sierra"
  "We're All Alone"
  "Simone"  (Boz Scaggs, David Foster)
  "I'll Be the One"

Personnel 

CD Credits
 Boz Scaggs – lead vocals, guitar (1-4, 8, 12), keyboard programming (3), drum programming (3), lead guitar (9), keyboards (9), backing vocals (12)
 Dean Parks – acoustic guitar (1, 4), electric guitar (4)
 Fred Tackett – guitar (2, 6, 10, 11), acoustic guitar (9)
 Ray Parker Jr. – electric guitar (4), backing vocals (4)
 Robben Ford – guitar (7)
 Ricky Fataar – guitar (8, 9, 12), keyboards (8, 9, 12), drums (8, 9, 12), percussion (8, 9, 12)
 David Paich – additional arrangements (1), keyboards (1), organ (4), Wurlitzer electric piano (4)
 Greg Phillinganes – electric piano (1), keyboards (4), backing vocals (4)
 Randy Kerber – keyboards (2), acoustic piano (5, 6, 10), string arrangements and conductor (5)
 Aaron Zigman – keyboards (2), synth string arrangements (2)
 Michael Rodriguez – keyboard programming (3), drum programming (3), programming (12)
 Michael Omartian – keyboards (7)
 William "Smitty" Smith – organ (7)
 Kevin Bents – acoustic piano (9)
 Booker T. Jones – Hammond B3 organ (9)
 Jai Winding – acoustic piano (11)
 Dave Carpenter – bass (1, 2, 6, 10, 11)
 Nathan East – bass (1, 4, 8, 9)
 Neil Stubenhaus - bass (5)
 Roscoe Beck – bass (7)
 James "Hutch" Hutchinson – bass (8)
 Jim Keltner – drums (7)
 Curt Bisquera – percussion (1, 6, 11), drums (2, 4, 5)
 Lenny Castro – percussion (1, 4)
 Tom Scott – tenor saxophone (1)
 Norbet Stachel – saxophone (11)
 Kathy Merrick – backing vocals (1, 6, 11)
 Lisa Fraizer – backing vocals (1, 2, 6, 11)

DVD Credits
 Boz Scaggs – lead vocals, guitar 
 Drew Zing – guitar
 Jim Cox – keyboards
 Matt Bissonette – bass
 John Ferraro – drums
 Charles McNeal – saxophones, flute
 Rich Armstrong – trumpet
 Barbara Wilson – backing vocals
 Conesha Monét Owens – backing vocals

Production 

CD Credits
 Producers – Boz Scaggs; David Paich (Tracks 1 & 4); Ricky Fataar (Tracks 7, 8 & 12).
 Recorded by Michael Rodriguez 
 Mixing – Steve MacMillan (Tracks 1-11); Michael Rodriguez (Track 12).
 Mastered by Bernie Grundman at Bernie Grundman Mastering (Hollywood, California).

DVD Credits
 Director – Lawrence Jordan
 Producers – Daniel E. Catullo, Jack Gulick and David Paich.
 Executive Producers – Daniel E. Catullo, Jack Gulick and Craig Fruin.
 Recorded by Michael Rodriguez 
 Mixed by Steve MacMillan 
 Editors – Guy Harding and Chris Lovett
 Filmed at The Great American Music Hall (San Francisco, CA).

Other Credits
 Art Direction and Design – Lex Peltier and Rex Sforza
 Photography – Walter Chin

References

External links
Fade Into Light 1996 Lyrics
Fade Into Light 2005 Lyrics

Boz Scaggs albums
1996 albums
Albums produced by Michael Omartian
Albums produced by Ricky Fataar
Albums produced by Boz Scaggs